Ruta (commonly known as rue) is a genus of strongly scented evergreen subshrubs, 20–60 cm tall, in the family Rutaceae, native to the Mediterranean region, Macaronesia and southwest Asia. About ten species are accepted in the genus. The most well-known species is Ruta graveolens (rue or common rue).

The leaves are bipinnate or tripinnate, with a feathery appearance, and green to strongly glaucous blue-green in colour. The flowers are yellow, with 4–5 petals, about 1 cm diameter, and borne in cymes. The fruit is a 4–5-lobed capsule, containing numerous seeds.

Species
, Plants of the World Online accepted ten species:
Ruta angustifolia Pers.
Ruta chalepensis L.
Ruta corsica DC.
Ruta graveolens L.
Ruta lamarmorae Bacch., Brullo & Giusso
Ruta lindsayi Turrill
Ruta microcarpa Svent.
Ruta montana (L.) L.
Ruta oreojasme Webb
Ruta pinnata L.f.

Medicinal uses

Extracts from rue have been used to treat eyestrain, sore eyes, and as insect repellent. Rue has been used internally as an antispasmodic, as a treatment for menstrual problems, as an abortifacient, and as a sedative.
Ruta graveolens and Ruta chalepensis are often confused in scientific literature.

Traditional uses
Since medieval times, rue has been used as an additive to wines (both white and red) to enhance its flavour and its keeping properties. The Dutch name wijnruit, translates as wine rue. In Italy, rue is added to grappa to produce Grappa alla Ruta. Rue's toxicity has long been known but since it appears to be slight it has been used as an additive in wine for a long time.

Precautions
Caution should be taken with using rue topically. Applied to the skin with sun exposure, the oil and leaves can cause blistering. Some people are much more sensitive than others.

References

 
Rutaceae genera
Herbs
Medicinal plants